Data reporting is the process of collecting and  submitting data which gives rise to accurate analyses of the facts on the ground; inaccurate data reporting can lead to vastly uninformed decision-making based on erroneous evidence. Different from data analysis that transforms data and information into insights, data reporting is the previous step that translates raw data into information. When data is not reported, the problem is known as underreporting; the opposite problem leads to false positives.

Data reporting can be an incredibly difficult endeavor. Census bureaus may hire even hundreds of thousands of workers to achieve the task of counting all of the residents of a country. Teachers use data from student assessments to determine grades; cellphone manufacturers rely on sales data from retailers to point the way to which models to increase production of. The effective management of nearly any company relies on accurate data.

References

Descriptive statistics
Data processing